Eline Koster (born 14 January 1997) is a Dutch footballer who plays as a midfielder for ADO Den Haag in the Eredivisie.

Club career

International career

Personal life
Koster was born in Heinenoord.

Honours

Club

International

References

Living people
Dutch women's footballers
Eredivisie (women) players
1997 births
Women's association football midfielders
ADO Den Haag (women) players